Narcos: Mexico is an American-Mexican crime drama streaming television series created and produced by Chris Brancato, Carlo Bernard, and Doug Miro that premiered on Netflix on November 16, 2018. It was originally intended to be the fourth season of the Netflix series Narcos, but it was ultimately developed as a companion series. It focuses on the development of Mexico's illegal drug trade, whereas the parent series centered on the establishment of Colombia's illegal drug trade. The series' second season premiered on February 13, 2020. On October 28, 2020, Netflix renewed the series for a third and final season but announced that actor Diego Luna would not be returning to reprise his role as Félix Gallardo. The third and final season premiered on November 5, 2021.

Premise
The series explores the early origins of the Mexican drug war, beginning at the time when traffickers were a loose and disorganized confederation of small, independent marijuana growers and dealers. It dramatizes the creation and rise of the Guadalajara Cartel in the 1980s as Miguel Ángel Félix Gallardo (Diego Luna) unifies several plazas, or territories, in order to build an infamous drug empire. Drug Enforcement Administration (DEA) agent Kiki Camarena (Michael Peña) moves his wife and young son from California to Guadalajara to take on a new post, where he quickly learns that his assignment will be more challenging than he could ever have imagined. Following Camarena's torture and murder by the cartel, DEA agent Walt Breslin brings a small covert squad of operatives to Mexico to track down and punish Gallardo and his associates.

Cast and characters

Main
 Michael Peña as Kiki Camarena – a DEA agent who garners valuable intel about Félix's organization (season 1)
 Diego Luna as Miguel Ángel Félix Gallardo – the leader of the Guadalajara Cartel and founder of the modern Mexican drug trade (seasons 1–2; guest season 3)
 Tenoch Huerta as Rafael "Rafa" Caro Quintero – Felix's business partner (season 1; guest season 2) 
 Alyssa Diaz as Mika Camarena – Kiki's wife (season 1)
 Joaquín Cosío as Ernesto "Don Neto" Fonseca Carrillo – Felix's business partner, Amado's uncle (season 1; guest season 2; recurring season 3)
 José María Yazpik as Amado Carrillo Fuentes – Felix's business partner, Neto's nephew (reprising his role from Narcos)
 Matt Letscher as Jaime Kuykendall – head of the Guadalajara bureau of the DEA (seasons 1 and 3; guest season 2)
 Ernesto Alterio as Salvador Osuna Nava – Director-General of the Mexican Dirección Federal de Seguridad  (season 1)
 Alejandro Edda as Joaquín "El Chapo" Guzmán – a member of the Sinaloa Cartel (seasons 1–3)
 Fernanda Urrejola as Maria Elvira – Felix's wife  (seasons 1–2)
 Teresa Ruiz as Isabella Bautista – Felix's friend and business associate (based on Sandra Ávila Beltrán) (seasons 1–2)
 Aaron Staton as Butch Sears – a DEA agent (season 1)
 Lenny Jacobson as Roger Knapp –  a DEA agent (season 1)
 Gerardo Taracena as Pablo Acosta – the leader of the Juarez Cartel (seasons 1–2)
 Julio Cesar Cedillo as Commander Guillermo González Calderoni – the commander of the Mexican Federal Judicial Police (seasons 1–2)
 Scoot McNairy as Walt Breslin – a DEA agent, and narrator of the story (seasons 2–3; recurring season 1)
 Alfonso Dosal as Benjamín Arellano Félix – the leader of the Tijuana Cartel, Enedina's and Ramón's older brother (seasons 2–3; recurring season 1)
 Mayra Hermosillo as Enedina Arellano Félix – a high-ranking member of the Tijuana Cartel, Benjamín's and Ramón's sister (seasons 2–3)
 Manuel Masalva as Ramón Arellano Félix – an enforcer and high-ranking member of the Tijuana Cartel, Benjamín's and Enedina's younger brother (seasons 2–3; recurring season 1)
 Miguel Rodarte as Danilo Garza – a Mexican police officer and member of Operation Leyenda (season 2)
 Alex Knight as Kenny Moss – a DEA agent and member of Operation Leyenda (main season 2, guest season 1)
 Jesse Garcia as Sal Orozco – a DEA agent and member of Operation Leyenda (season 2)
 Matt Biedel as Daryl Petsky –  a DEA agent and member of Operation Leyenda (season 2)
 Jero Medina as Ossie Mejía – a Mexican police officer and member of Operation Leyenda (season 2)
 Alberto Zeni as Amat Palacios – a Mexican police officer and member of Operation Leyenda  (season 2)
 Gorka Lasaosa as Héctor Luis Palma Salazar – a member of the Sinaloa Cartel (seasons 2–3; recurring season 1)
 Andres Londono as Enrique Clavel – Felix's right-hand man (season 2)
 Alberto Ammann as Hélmer "Pacho" Herrera – a high-ranking member of the Cali Cartel (reprising his role from Narcos) (seasons 2–3; guest season 1)
 Flavio Medina as Juan García Abrego – the leader of the Gulf Cartel and Guerra's nephew (seasons 2–3)
 Luis Gerardo Méndez as Victor Tapia – a Juarez police officer drawn to a series of killings (season 3)
 Luisa Rubino as Andrea Nuñez – a young journalist investigating the activities of the cartel, works for La Voz de Tijuana (season 3)
 José Zúñiga as General Jesús Gutiérrez Rebollo – a Mexican military general opposing the cartels (season 3)
 Beau Mirchoff as Steve Sheridan – a DEA agent (season 3)
 Kristen Gutoskie as Dani – Walt's girlfriend (season 3)
 Bobby Soto as David Barron Corona – a high-ranking member of the Logan Heights Gang and hit-man for the Tijuana cartel (season 3; recurring season 2)
 Lorenzo Ferro as Alex Hodoyan – a member of Ramón's Narcojuniors gang (season 3)
 Alejandro Furth as Ramon Salgado – co-founder of La Voz de Tijuana and Andrea's boss (season 3)
 Alberto Guerra as Ismael "El Mayo" Zambada – an independent drug trafficker using his fishing business as a front (season 3)

Recurring
 Tessa Ía as Sofia Conesa (season 1)
 Clark Freeman as Ed Heath (seasons 1–2)
 Fermin Martinez as Juan José "El Azul" Esparragoza Moreno (seasons 1–3)
 Guillermo Villegas as Sammy Alvarez (season 1)
 Horacio Garcia Rojas as Tomas Morlet (season 1)
 Jackie Earle Haley as Jim Ferguson (season 1)
 Yul Vazquez as John Gavin (season 1)
 Brian Buckley as John Clay Walker (season 1)
 Mark Kubr as Tony (season 1)
 Mike Doyle as Thomas Buehl (season 1)
 Wagner Moura as Pablo Escobar (reprising his role from Narcos) (seasons 1 and 3)
 Francisco Denis as Miguel Rodríguez Orejuela (reprising his role from Narcos) (season 1)
 Pêpê Rapazote as José "Chepe" Santacruz-Londoño (reprising his role from Narcos) (seasons 1 and 3)
 Jorge A. Jimenez as Roberto "Poison" Ramos (reprising his role from Narcos) (season 1)
 Eric Lange as Bill Stechner (reprising his role from Narcos) (seasons 1–2)
 Milton Cortés as Rubén Zuno Arce (season 1–2)
 Julián Díaz as Blackie (reprising his role from Narcos) (season 1)
 Francisco Barreiro as Francisco Rafael Arellano Félix (seasons 1–3)
 Julián Arango as Orlando Henao Montoya (reprising his role from Narcos) (season 2–3)
 Matias Varela as Jorge Salcedo Cabrera (reprising his role from Narcos) (season 2)
 Juan Sebastián Calero as Navegante (reprising his role from Narcos) (season 2)
 Viviana Serna as Guadalupe Leija Serrano ("Lupita"), wife of Héctor Luis Palma Salazar (season 2)
 Sosie Bacon as Mimi Webb Miller (season 2)
 Jesús Ochoa as Juan Nepomuceno Guerra (seasons 2–3)
 Noé Hernández as Rafael Aguilar Guajardo (seasons 2–3)
 José Julián as Javier Arellano Félix (seasons 2–3)
 Sebastián Buitrón as Eduardo Arellano Félix (seasons 2–3)
 Adriana Llabrés as Ruth Arellano Félix (seasons 2–3)
 Manuel Uriza as Carlos Hank Gonzalez (season 3)
 Damayanti Quintanar as Hortencia Tapia (season 3)
 James Earl as Craig Mills (season 3)
 Benito Antonio Martínez Ocasio as Everardo Arturo “Kitty” Paez (season 3)
 Yessica Borroto as Marta (season 3)
 Damián Alcázar as Gilberto Rodríguez Orejuela (reprising his role from Narcos) (season 3)
 Diego Calva as Arturo Beltran Leyva (season 3)
 Fernando Bonilla as Vicente Carrillo Fuentes (season 3)
 Markin López as Rogelio (season 3)
 Iván Aragón as Alfredo Hodoyan (season 3)
 Eric Etebari as Jack Dorian (season 3)

Episodes

Season 1 (2018)

Season 2 (2020)

Season 3 (2021)

Production

Development
Netflix renewed Narcos for two more seasons on September 6, 2016, a few days after the release of the second season. Production on the fourth season began in Mexico in late 2017, following the release of the third season. On July 18, 2018, Netflix announced that the fourth season would instead "reset" with almost an entirely new cast as a new Netflix original series titled Narcos: Mexico.

The first season was released on November 16, 2018, and Netflix renewed it for a second season on December 5, 2018.

Cast and crew
In December 2017, Michael Peña and Diego Luna were announced to star in the upcoming series. A few days later, Matt Letscher joined the cast in a regular role. Other key cast members revealed by showrunner Eric Newman include Tenoch Huerta, Joaquín Cosío, Teresa Ruiz, Alyssa Diaz, and José María Yazpik (reprising his role from the third season of Narcos).

Amat Escalante and Alonso Ruizpalacios directed episodes for the upcoming series, while Colombian Andi Baiz, director of several episodes for the first three seasons of Narcos, also directed for Narcos: Mexico. Actor Wagner Moura, who portrayed Pablo Escobar in the original Narcos also directed two episodes of season three. In October 2020, it was announced that Eric Newman had left as showrunner.

Murder of location scout
Carlos Muñoz Portal, one of the show's location scouts, was found murdered with multiple gunshot wounds on September 15, 2017, in central Mexico near the town of Temascalapa. A spokesman for the attorney general in Mexico said that there were no witnesses due to the remote location, but the authorities would continue to investigate. Authorities are considering the possibility of narco gang involvement, but the murder has not been solved.

Factual differences 
Although many of the events and characters are based on true history, some liberties were taken to streamline the story of the Mexican drug war into a cohesive narrative. The murders of John Clay Walker and Albert Radelat were real; however, they were reportedly tortured beforehand. The character of Sofia Conesa, portrayed as the love interest of Rafael Caro Quintero, was named Sara Cosio in real life. The killing of Hector Luis Palma's family on the orders of Miguel Angel Felix Gallardo is also a disputed claim which still needs documented verification, as it is actually believed to have been done on the orders of the Arellano Félix brothers and in a more brutal fashion. The assassination of El Azul in Season 3 did not actually occur, as El Azul in real life was active until at least 2014, when his unconfirmed death of a  heart attack supposedly occurred.

In the third season, General Gutiérrez Rebollo, the Anti-Drug Czar, is arrested after Andrea Núñez finds the bank account receiving over $2 million USD and linking it to Rebollo. In reality, General Gutiérrez Rebollo received a call from the Secretary of Defense, General Enrique Cervantes, who ordered him to report to his office immediately on the night of February 6, 1997 where he was arrested. Also in this season, the men of the Tijuana Cartel escaped from the Guadalajara airport in a TAESA plane, allegedly owned by Carlos Hank González, after the murder of Cardenal Juan Jesús Posadas Ocampo.  However, Carlos Hank González was never the owner of this airline and there are multiple theories about the escape of the Tijuana Cartel that day, non which effectively link TAESA to the case. Likewise, there are a series of accusations against Hank Gonzalez linking him to organized crime that have no basis in real life. Hank has never been prosecuted or sentenced for such links. The reason, according to José María Yazpik, is that "since Hank is already dead, his name can be used, while in other seasons, when faced with a possible lawsuit, they opted to change the names".

Reception

Critical response
The first season of Narcos: Mexico has a score of 90% on Rotten Tomatoes based on 39 reviews with an average rating of 7.4/10, with the critics consensus stating "Dangerous, thrilling, and highly addictive, Narcos: Mexico's first season expertly expands the franchise by exploring new territory in the drug war's grim history and showcasing electric performances from Diego Luna and Michael Peña." On Metacritic, season one holds a weighted average score of 80 out of 100, based on 7 critics, indicating "generally favorable reviews".

The second season holds a rating of 81% on Rotten Tomatoes based on 16 reviews with a weighted average score of 7.6/10. The site's critical consensus reads, "As addictive -- and relevant -- as ever, Narcos: Mexico's sophomore season is definitely more violent, but it never spoils the rich drama fans have come to love."

The third and final season holds a score of 100% on Rotten Tomatoes based on seven reviews with an average rating of 7/10.

Accolades

References

External links
 
 

Narcos
English-language Netflix original programming
Spanish-language Netflix original programming
2010s American crime drama television series
2018 American television series debuts
2020s American crime drama television series
2021 American television series endings
American biographical series
Cali Cartel
Drug Enforcement Administration in fiction
Guadalajara Cartel
Juárez Cartel
Medellín Cartel
Norte del Valle Cartel
Serial drama television series
Sinaloa Cartel
Television series about organized crime
Television series about illegal drug trade
Television series by Gaumont International Television
Television series set in the 1980s
Television shows about drugs
Television shows filmed in Mexico
Television shows set in Mexico
Tijuana Cartel
Works about Colombian drug cartels
Works about Mexican drug cartels
Television shows scored by Gustavo Santaolalla